Egeberg may refer to:

Surname:
Ferdinand Julian Egeberg (1842–1921), Norwegian military officer, chamberlain and timber merchant
Fredrikke Egeberg (1815–1861), Norwegian pianist and composer
Ingjerd Egeberg (born 1967), Norwegian actress and theatre director
Ivar Egeberg (born 1950), Norwegian sports official, retired athlete and politician for the Centre Party
Martin Egeberg (1896–1977), Norwegian sport wrestler who competed in three Summer Olympics
Roger O. Egeberg (1902–1997), American medical educator, administrator and advocate of public health
Westye Egeberg (1770–1830), Danish-Norwegian businessperson
Westye Parr Egeberg (1877–1959), Norwegian military officer, businessperson and politician for the Conservative Party

Given name:
Carsten Egeberg Borchgrevink (1864–1934), Anglo-Norwegian polar explorer and a pioneer of modern Antarctic travel
Per Egeberg Giertsen (1906–1990), Norwegian physician, helped members of the World War II Norwegian resistance movement
Johan Egeberg Mellbye (1866–1954), the leader of the Norwegian Centre Party in the period 1920–1921

Geography:
Egeberg Castle (Norwegian: Egebergslottet) a building in St. Hanshaugen, Oslo, Norway
Egeberg Glacier, small glacier flowing into the west side of Robertson Bay, Victoria Land

See also
Egbert (disambiguation)
Eggberg
Eikeberg
Ekberg
Ekeberg (surname)
Segeberg